HMS Cricket was a Royal Navy Insect-class gunboat. She was built by Barclay Curle and launched on 17 December 1915.

During the First World War, Cricket took part in the Mesopotamian Campaign as part of the gunboat squadron operating on the Euphrates and Tigris rivers. During the Russian Civil War, Cricket served as part of the British intervention forces fighting in support of White Russian forces on the Dvina River during 1919-1920.

During the Second World War, Cricket was in China until 1940 then transferred to the Mediterranean Fleet's Inshore Squadron. On 12 July 1941 she was crippled in an air attack by Regia Aeronautica unit 97 Gruppo (Group) and its 239 Squadriglia (Squadron), led by Major Giuseppe Cenni. One of Cenni's crew took a picture of her during the attack.

She was declared a constructive total loss on 30 June 1942 and stripped for spares at Alexandria, Egypt in 1942. Her hull was towed to Cyprus and used as a target for Royal Air Force training off Dhekelia where the hull is an attraction for scuba divers.

References

Bibliography
  Lenton, H. T. and Colledge, J.J. (1973) Warships of World War II,  2nd ed., Shepperton : Ian Allan, 653 p., 
 Smith, Peter C. The Junkers Ju 87 Stuka: A Complete History. London: Crécy Publishing, 2011. .

External links 
 HMS Cricket, Lost and Found
 HMS Cricket, More Information

Insect-class gunboats
World War II shipwrecks in the Mediterranean Sea
1915 ships
Maritime incidents in June 1941
Maritime incidents in June 1942
Ships sunk as targets